The 44th Ontario general election is tentatively scheduled to be held on June 4, 2026. As of December 2016, Ontario elections are held on the first Thursday in June in the fourth calendar year following the previous general election, unless the Legislative Assembly of Ontario is dissolved earlier by the Lieutenant Governor of Ontario due to a motion of no confidence. Such a dissolution is unlikely as the current government has a majority.

Standings

|-
!rowspan="2" colspan="2" align=left|Party
!rowspan="2" align=left|Party leader
!colspan="2" align=center|Seats
|-
!align="center"|2022
!align="center"|Current

|align=left|Doug Ford
|83
|82

|align=left|Marit Stiles
|31
|31

|align=left|John Fraser (interim)
|8
|8

|align=left|Mike Schreiner
|1
|1

| colspan="2" style="text-align:left;" | Independent
|1
|2
|-
|align=left colspan="3"|Total
| align="right"|124
| align="right"|124
|}

Timeline

2022
June 2: The Progressive Conservative Party of Ontario under Doug Ford wins a second majority government in the 43rd Ontario general election. New Democratic Party leader Andrea Horwath and Liberal leader Steven Del Duca both announce their resignation on election night.
June 28: Toronto—Danforth MPP Peter Tabuns is named interim leader of the NDP, becoming Leader of the Official Opposition.
August 3: Ottawa South MPP John Fraser is named interim leader of the Liberals.
August 15: Hamilton Centre MPP Andrea Horwath resigns her seat to run for Mayor of Hamilton.

2023
February 4: Marit Stiles was declared leader of the Ontario New Democratic Party.
March 10: Don Valley North MPP Vincent Ke resigned from the Progressive Conservative caucus after allegations that he was involved in the 2019 Canadian Parliament infiltration plot.
March 16: Hamilton Centre by-election was  held, with the Ontario New Democratic Party's Sarah Jama being elected MPP.

Ridings
The Electoral Boundaries Act, 2015 increased the number of electoral districts from 107 to 122, following the boundaries set out by the federal 2013 Representation Order for Ontario, while preserving the special boundaries of the 11 seats in Northern Ontario set out in the 1996 redistribution.

The Far North Electoral Boundaries Commission, appointed in 2016, recommended the creation of the additional districts of Kiiwetinoong and Mushkegowuk—James Bay, carved out from the existing Kenora—Rainy River and Timmins—James Bay ridings, which accordingly raised the total number of seats to 124. This was implemented through the Representation Statute Law Amendment Act, 2017.

With the 2022 Canadian federal electoral redistribution, it is expected that Ontario will be allotted 1 additional seat in the House of Commons, which would potentially increase the number of seats in the Legislative Assembly of Ontario.

Opinion polls

Notes

References

Opinion poll sources

External links
Elections Ontario

Next